Xenoestrogens are a type of xenohormone that imitates estrogen. They can be either synthetic or natural chemical compounds.  Synthetic xenoestrogens include some widely used industrial compounds, such as PCBs, BPA, and phthalates, which have estrogenic effects on a living organism even though they differ chemically from the estrogenic substances produced internally by the endocrine system of any organism.  Natural xenoestrogens include phytoestrogens which are plant-derived xenoestrogens.  Because the primary route of exposure to these compounds is by consumption of phytoestrogenic plants, they are sometimes called "dietary estrogens".  Mycoestrogens, estrogenic substances from fungi, are another type of xenoestrogen that are also considered mycotoxins.

Xenoestrogens are clinically significant because they can mimic the effects of endogenous estrogen and thus have been implicated in precocious puberty and other disorders of the reproductive system.

Xenoestrogens include pharmacological estrogens (in which estrogenic action is an intended effect, as in the drug ethinylestradiol used in contraceptive pills), but other chemicals may also have estrogenic effects. Xenoestrogens have been introduced into the environment by industrial, agricultural and chemical companies and consumers only in the last 70 years or so, but archiestrogens exist naturally. Some plants (like the cereals and the legumes) are using estrogenic substances possibly as part of their natural defence against herbivore animals by controlling their fertility.

The potential ecological and human health impact of xenoestrogens is of growing concern.  The word xenoestrogen is derived from the Greek words ξένο (xeno, meaning foreign), οἶστρος (estrus, meaning sexual desire) and γόνο (gene, meaning "to generate") and literally means "foreign estrogen".  Xenoestrogens are also called "environmental hormones" or "EDC" (Endocrine Disrupting Compounds).   Most scientists that study xenoestrogens, including The Endocrine Society, regard them as serious environmental hazards that have hormone disruptive effects on both wildlife and humans.

Mechanism of action 
The onset of puberty is characterized by increased levels of hypothalamic gonadotropin releasing hormone (GnRH). GnRH triggers the secretion of luteinizing hormone (LH) and follicle-stimulating hormone (FSH) from the anterior pituitary gland, which in turn causes the ovaries to respond and secrete estradiol.  Increases in gonadal estrogen promote breast development, female fat distribution and skeletal growth.  Adrenal androgen and gonadal androgen result in pubic and axillary hair. Peripheral precocious puberty caused by exogenous estrogens is evaluated by assessing decreased levels of gonadotrophins.

Xenoestrogens in plastics, packaged food, drink trays and containers, (more so, when they've been heated in the Sun, or an oven), may interfere with pubertal development by actions at different levels – hypothalamic-pituitary axis, gonads, peripheral target organs such as the breast, hair follicles and genitals.  Exogenous chemicals that mimic estrogen can alter the functions of the endocrine system and cause various health defects by interfering with synthesis, metabolism, binding or cellular responses of natural estrogens.

Although the physiology of the reproductive system is complex, the action of environmental exogenous estrogens is hypothesized to occur by two possible mechanisms. Xenoestrogens may temporarily or permanently alter the feedback loops in the brain, pituitary, gonads, and thyroid by mimicking the effects of estrogen and triggering their specific receptors or they may bind to hormone receptors and block the action of natural hormones.  Thus it is plausible that environmental estrogens can accelerate sexual development if present in a sufficient concentration or with chronic exposure. The similarity in the structure of exogenous estrogens and the estrogens has changed the hormone balance within the body and resulted in various reproductive problems in females. The overall mechanism of action is binding of the exogenous compounds that mimic estrogen to the estrogen binding receptors and cause the determined action in the target organs.

Effects 

Xenoestrogens have been implicated in a variety of medical problems, and during the last 10 years many scientific studies have found hard evidence of adverse effects on human and animal health.

There is a concern that xenoestrogens may act as false messengers and disrupt the process of reproduction. Xenoestrogens, like all estrogens, can increase growth of the endometrium, so treatments for endometriosis include avoidance of products which contain them. Likewise, they are avoided in order to prevent the onset or aggravation of adenomyosis. Studies have implicated observations of disturbances in wildlife with estrogenic exposure.  For example, discharge from human settlement including runoff and water flowing out of wastewater treatment plants release a large amount of xenoestrogens into streams, which lead to immense alterations in aquatic life.  With a bioaccumulation factor of 105 –106, fish are extremely susceptible to pollutants.  Streams in more arid conditions are thought to have more effects due to higher concentrations of the chemicals arising from lack of dilution.

When comparing fish from above a wastewater treatment plant and below a wastewater treatment plant, studies found disrupted ovarian and testicular histopathology, gonadal intersex, reduced gonad size, vitellogenin induction, and altered sex ratios.

The sex ratios are female biased because xenoestrogens interrupt gonadal configuration causing complete or partial sex reversal.  When comparing adjacent populations of white sucker fish, the exposed female fish can have up to five oocyte stages and asynchronously developing ovaries versus the unexposed female fish who usually have two oocyte stages and group-synchronously developing ovaries.  Previously, this type of difference has only been found between tropical and temperate species.

Sperm concentrations and motility perimeters are reduced in male fish exposed to xenoestrogens in addition to disrupt stages of spermatogenesis.  Moreover, xenoestrogens have been leading to vast amounts of intersex in fish.  For example, one study indicates the numbers of intersex in white sucker fish to be equal to the number of males in the population downstream of a waste water treatment plant.  No intersex members were found upstream from the plant.  Also, they found differences in the proportion of testicular and ovarian tissue and its degree of organization between the intersex fish.  Furthermore, xenoestrogens expose fish to CYP1A inducers through inhibiting a putative labile protein and enhancing the Ah receptor, which has been linked to epizootics of cancer and the initiation of tumors.

The induction of CYP1A has been established to be a good bioindicator for xenoestrogen exposure.  In addition, xenoestrogens stimulate vitellogenin (Vtg), which acts as a nutrient reserve, and Zona readiata proteins (Zrp), which forms eggshells.  Therefore, Vtg and Zrp are biomarkers to exposure for fish.

Another potential effect of xenoestrogens is on oncogenes, specifically in relation to breast cancer. Some scientists doubt that xenoestrogens have any significant biological effect, in the concentrations found in the environment. However, there is substantial evidence in a variety of recent studies to indicate that xenoestrogens can increase breast cancer growth in tissue culture.

It has been suggested that very low levels of a xenoestrogen, Bisphenol A, could affect fetal neural signalling more than higher levels, indicating that classical models where dose equals response may not be applicable in susceptible tissue. As this study involved intra-cerebellar injections, its relevance to environmental exposures is unclear, as is the role of an estrogenic effect compared to some other toxic effect of bisphenol A.

Other scientists argue that the observed effects are spurious and inconsistent, or that the quantities of the agents are too low to have any effect. A 1997 survey of scientists in fields pertinent to evaluating estrogens found that 13 percent regarded the health threats from xenoestrogens as "major," 62 percent as "minor" or "none," and 25 percent were unsure.

There has been speculation that falling sperm counts in males may be due to increased estrogen exposure in utero. Sharpe in a 2005 review indicated that external estrogenic substances are too weak in their cumulative effects to alter male reproductive functioning, but indicates that the situation appears to be more complex as external chemicals may affect the internal testosterone-estrogen balance.

Impact 

The ubiquitous presence of such estrogenic substances is a significant health concern, both individually and for a population. Life relies on the transmission of biochemical information to the next generation, and the presence of xenoestrogens may interfere with this transgenerational information process through "chemical confusion" (Vidaeff and Sever), who state: "The results do not support with certainty the view that environmental estrogens contribute to an increase in male reproductive disorders, neither do they provide sufficient grounds to reject such a hypothesis."

A 2008 report demonstrates further evidence of widespread effects of feminizing chemicals on male development in each class of vertebrate species as a worldwide phenomenon. Ninety-nine percent of over 100,000 recently introduced chemicals are underregulated, according to the European Commission.

Agencies such as the United States Environmental Protection Agency and the World Health Organization International Programme on Chemical Safety are charged to address these issues.

Precocious puberty 

Puberty is a complex developmental process defined as the transition from childhood to adolescence and adult reproductive function. The first sign of female puberty is an acceleration of growth followed by the development of a palpable breast bud (thelarche). The median age of thelarche is 9.8 years. Although the sequence may be reversed, androgen dependent changes such as growth of axillary and pubic hair, body odor and acne (adrenarche) usually appears 2 years later. Onset of menstruation (menarche) is a late event (median 12.8 years), occurring after the peak of growth has passed.

Puberty is considered precocious (precocious puberty) if secondary sex characteristics occur before the age of 8 in girls and 9 years in boys. Increased growth is often the first change in precocious puberty, followed by breast development and growth of pubic hair.  However, thelarche, adrenarche, and linear growth can occur simultaneously and although uncommon, menarche can be the first sign. Precocious puberty can be classified into central (gonadotropin-dependent) precocious puberty or peripheral (gonadotropin-independent) puberty. Peripheral precocious puberty has been linked to exposure to exogenous estrogenic compounds.

Age of onset of puberty is influenced by many factors such as genetics, nutritional status, ethnicity and environmental factors including socio-economic conditions and geographical location. A decline of age at onset of puberty from 17 years of age to 13 years of age has occurred over a period of 200 years until the middle of the 20th century. Trends toward earlier puberty have been attributed to improved public health and living conditions. A leading hypothesis for this change toward early puberty is improved nutrition resulting in rapid body growth, increased weight and fat deposition. However, many opponents believe that chemical exposure may play a role. Two recent epidemiologic studies in the United States (PROS and NMANES III) highlighted a recent unexpected advance in sexual maturation in girls. American, European and Asian studies suggest breast development in girls occurs at a much younger age than a few decades ago, irrespective of race and socioeconomic conditions. Environmental chemical exposure is one of the factors implicated in the recent downward trend of earlier sexual maturation.

Thelarche in Puerto Rico 
Since 1979, pediatric endocrinologists in Puerto Rico recognized an increase in number of patients with premature thelarche. The presence of phthalates were measured in the blood of 41 girls experiencing early onset breast development and matched set of controls.  The average age of girls with premature thelarche was 31 months.  They found high phthalate levels in the girls suffering from premature thelarche compared to the controls. Not all cases of premature thelarche in the study sample contained elevated levels of phthalate esters and there was concern whether artificial contamination from vinyl lab equipment and tubing invalidated the results, hence weakening the link between exposure and causation.

Tuscany precocious puberty cases 
Dr. Massart and colleagues from the University of Pisa studied the increased prevalence of precocious puberty in a region of northwest Tuscany. This region of Italy is represented by a high density of navy yards and greenhouses where exposures to pesticides and mycoestrogens (estrogens produced by fungi) are common.   Although unable to identify a definitive cause of the high rates of precocious puberty, the authors concluded environmental pesticides and herbicides may be implicated.

Dairy contamination 
Animal feed was contaminated with several thousand pounds of polybrominated biphenyl in Michigan in 1973 resulting in high exposures of PBB in the population via milk and other products from contaminated cows.  Perinatal exposure of children was estimated by measuring PBB in serum of mothers some years after exposure.  Girls that had been exposed to high PBB levels through lactation had an earlier age of menarche and pubic hair development than girls who had less perinatal exposure.  The study noted there no differences found in the timing of breast development among the cases and controls.

Fish contamination 
The Great Lakes have been polluted with industrial wastes (mainly PCBs and DDT) since the beginning of the 20th century.  These compounds have accumulated in birds and sports fish.  A study was designed to assess the impact of consumption of contaminated fish on pregnant women and their children.  Concentrations of maternal serum PCB and DDE and their daughters' age at menarche were reviewed.  In multivariate analysis, DDE but not PCB was linked with a lowered age of menarche. Limitations of the study included indirect measurement of the exposure and self reporting of menarche.

Implications 

Precocious puberty has numerous significant physical, psychological and social implications for a young girl. Unfortunately, premature pubertal growth spurt and accelerated bone maturation will result in premature closure of distal epiphysis which causes reduced adult height and short stature. In 1999, US Food and Drug Administration has recommended to not take estrogen in food of more than 3.24 ng per day for females. Precocious puberty has also been implicated in pediatric and adult obesity. Some studies have suggested precocious puberty places girls at a higher risk of breast cancer later in life. Precocious puberty is linked with other gynecologic disorders such as endometriosis, adenomyosis, polycystic ovarian syndrome and infertility. Precocious puberty can lead to psychosocial distress, a poor self-image, and poor self-esteem.  Girls with secondary sex characteristics at such a young age are more likely to be bullied and suffer from sexual abuse.  Studies indicate that girls who become sexually mature at earlier ages are also more likely to engage in risk-taking behaviors such as smoking, alcohol or drug use, and engage in unprotected sex.

The current literature is inadequate to provide the information we need to assess the extent to which environmental chemicals contribute to precocious puberty. Gaps in our knowledge are the result of limitations in the designs of studies, small sample sizes, challenges to conducting exposure assessment and the few number of chemicals studied. Unfortunately exposure is inferred and not actually measured in available studies. The ability to detect the possible role of chemicals in altering pubertal development is confounded by many nutritional, genetic and lifestyle factors capable of affecting puberty and the complex nature of the reproductive endocrine system. Other research challenges include shifts in exposure levels among populations over time and simultaneous exposures to multiple compounds. Overall the literature does not with certainty support the contention that environmental chemicals or dietary factors are having widespread effects on human sexual development.  However data does not refute such a hypothesis either.  Accelerated sexual development is plausible in individuals exposed to high concentration of estrogenic substances.  There is a concerning steady increase in exposure to a wide variety of xenoestrogens in the industrial world.  Further research is needed to assess the impact of these compounds on pubertal development.

In other animals 

Non-human animal studies have shown that exposure to environmental contaminants with estrogenic activity can accelerate the onset of puberty.  A potential mechanism has been described in rats exposed to DDT or beta-estradiol in which GnRH pulsatile secretion was found to be increased. Oral exposure of female rats to xenoestrogens has been shown to cause pseudo precocious puberty (early vaginal opening and early first estrus). A study of dioxin in immature female rats induced early follicular development and phthalates are known to decrease the anogenital distance in newborn rats. Although this article focuses on the effects of xenoestrogens and reproductive function in females, numerous animal studies also implicate environmental estrogens' and androgens' adverse effects on the male reproduction system. Administration of estrogens to developing male animals reduces testicular weight and decreases sperm production. The small phallus size of male alligators has been linked to contamination of their natural Florida habitat with DDT. Data from animal research is abundant demonstrating the adverse effects on reproduction of hormonally active compounds found in the environment.

Common environmental estrogens

Atrazine 
Atrazine is widely used as an herbicide to control broad-leaf weed species that grow in crops such as corn, sugarcane, hay and winter wheat. Atrazine is also applied to Christmas trees, residential lawns, golf courses, and other recreational areas. Atrazine is the second largest selling pesticide in the world and estimated to be the most heavily used herbicide in the United States. Atrazine has been implicated in interfering with the neuroendocrine system, blocking the release of gonadotropin-releasing hormone (GnRH) which in turn reduces luteinizing hormone (LH) and follicle stimulating hormone (FSH) levels.

BPA 
BPA (Bisphenol A) is the monomer used to manufacture polycarbonate plastic and epoxy resins used as a lining in most food and beverage cans. The ester bonds in the BPA-based polycarbonates could be subject to hydrolysis and leaching of BPA. But in the case of epoxypolymers formed from bisphenol A, it is not possible to release bisphenol A by such a reaction. It is also noteworthy that, of the bisphenols, bisphenol A is a weak xenoestrogen. Other compounds, such as bisphenol Z, have been shown to have stronger estrogenic effects in rats.

It has been suggested that biphenol A and other xenoestrogens might cause disease to humans and animals. One review suggests that bisphenol A exposure as a result of feasible scenarios could cause disease in humans.

Bisphenol S (BPS), an analog of BPA, has also been shown to alter estrogenic activity. One study demonstrated that when cultured rat pituitary cells were exposed to low levels of BPS, it altered the estrogen-estradiol signaling pathway and led to the inappropriate release of prolactin.

DDT 
DDT (Dichlorodiphenyltrichloroethane) was widely used in pesticides for agriculture until it was banned in 1972 in the United States due to its hazardous effects on the environment. DDT continues to be used in many parts of the world for agricultural use, insect control and to fight the spread of malaria.  DDT and its metabolites DDE and DDD are persistent in the environment and accumulate in fatty tissues.

In vertebrates, DDT is unable to be broken down and remains within the organism. In humans, there is little risk of DDT causing an increase in health risk upon exposure in adulthood, but in key developmental periods prenatally and in adolescence, there has been evidence to suggest an increased risk of breast cancer.

Dioxin 
Dioxin, a group of highly toxic chemicals are released during combustion processes, pesticide manufacturing and chlorine bleaching of wood pulp.  Dioxin is discharged into waterways from pulp and paper mills.  Consumption of animals fats is thought to be the primary pathway for human exposure.

Endosulfan 
Endosulfan is an insecticide used on numerous vegetables, fruits, cereal grains and trees. Endosulfan can be produced as a liquid concentrate, wettable powder or smoke tablet. Human exposure occurs through food consumption or ground and surface water contamination.

PBB 
PBB (Polybrominated biphenyls) are chemicals added to plastics used in computer monitors, televisions, textiles and plastics foams to make them more difficult to burn.  Manufacturing of PBBs in the United States stopped in 1976, however because they do not degrade easily PBBs continue to be found in soil, water and air.

PCBs
PCBs (Polychlorinated biphenyls) are man made organic chemicals known as chlorinated hydrocarbons.  PCBs were manufactured primarily for use as insulating fluids and coolants given their chemical stability, low flammability and electrical insulating properties.  PCBs were banned in 1979 but like DDT continue to persist in the environment.

Phthalates
Phthalates are plasticizers providing durability and flexibility to plastics such as polyvinyl chloride. High molecular weight phthalates are used in flooring, wall coverings and medical device such as intravenous bags and tubing.  Low molecular weight phthalates are found in perfumes, lotions, cosmetics, varnishes, lacquers and coatings including timed releases in pharmaceuticals.

Zeranol
Zeranol is currently used as an anabolic growth promoter for livestock in the US and Canada. It has been banned in the EU since 1985, but is still present as a contaminant in food through meat products that were exposed to it.

Miscellaneous

See also

References

External links
 "Our Stolen Future" book about endocrine disruption
 How to avoid xenoestrogens
 S. Safe on lack of evidence for any effect

Xenoestrogens
Endocrinology
Water pollution
Pollutants